LB, lb or lb. may refer to:

Businesses and organizations
 L Brands, an American clothing retailer
 Lane Bryant, a plus-size clothing retailer
 Laurier Brantford, a satellite campus of Wilfrid Laurier University in Brantford, Ontario, Canada
 Movement for Unification, a nationalist Albanian political party in Kosovo
 Ljubljana Bank, a bank named after and based in Ljubljana, Slovenia that operated in SFR Yugoslavia
  airline (IATA code)
  (Left Bank (online edition), a Ukrainien online newspaper

Places
Labrador (former postal abbreviation)
Lebanon (ISO 3166-1 alpha-2 country code)
Long Beach, California
Los Baños, Laguna (an abbreviation commonly used to address the town of Los Baños)

Science and technology

Mathematics and computing
.lb, the Internet country code top-level domain (ccTLD) for Lebanon
Lattice Boltzmann methods, a class of computational fluid dynamics (CFD) methods for fluid simulation
Liberty BASIC, a programming language
Binary logarithm, 
Lower bound, a mathematical concept in order theory

Units of measurement
Pound (mass), abbreviation derived from Latin libra
Pound-force

Other uses in science and technology
"L" shaped electrical conduit body with the outlet in the Back ("LB")
Lysogeny broth (also known as Luria or Luria-Bertani broth), a microbial growth medium

Sport
Left back, a defensive position in Association football
Linebacker, a position in American and Canadian football

Other uses
LB (car ferries), one of several ferries on the HH Ferry route between Elsinore, Denmark and Helsingborg, Sweden
Luxembourgish language (ISO 639 alpha-2 code)
Letterboxing (filming)